Tee to Green is a Canadian sports education television series which was broadcast on CBC Television in 1970.

Premise
Ernie Afaganis hosted the series which demonstrated golf skills for viewers. It was produced by CBC Edmonton and recorded at Jasper Park Lodge.

Scheduling
Half-hour episodes were broadcast on Saturdays at 12:00 p.m. from 13 June to 5 September 1970.

See also
 Golf With Stan Leonard
 Par 27

References

External links
 

CBC Television original programming
1970 Canadian television series debuts
1970 Canadian television series endings